Bend Municipal Airport  is  northeast of Bend, in Deschutes County, Oregon. The FAA's National Plan of Integrated Airport Systems for 2009–2013 categorizes it as a general aviation facility. Bend is home to Epic Aircraft and X-Air.

Most U.S. airports use the same three-letter location identifier for the FAA and IATA, but this airport is BDN to the FAA and has no IATA code (IATA assigned BDN to Talhar Airport in Badin, Pakistan).

History

A group of Bend citizens banded together to deed a small piece of farmland to the City of Bend for a municipal landing strip. The site was developed and used for pilot training through World War II. After the war, the airstrip was maintained by the City of Bend for civil use; it slowly grew during the 1950s and 1960s.

In 1979, development of an Airport Master Plan was undertaken. This plan established the direction for development at the airport and forecast significant growth in activity at the Bend Airport. This plan, however, was completed while general aviation was booming across the country. A downturn in the general economy affected general aviation in the 1980s and through the early 1990s, and the forecast growth did not materialize.

That changed by the late 1990s, and general aviation began a resurgence that continues today, along with increased business and corporate aviation travel to Bend. Bend Municipal Airport is poised to be the general aviation and corporate aviation gateway to Central Oregon. Continued development of Epic Aircraft, Leading Edge Aviation, Precise Flight, and other growing tenants on the airport have made an aviation business park of the Bend Airport. More than eighteen aviation-related businesses on the airport employ more than 1000 people, making the Bend Municipal Airport one of the largest concentrations of family-wage jobs in the Bend area.

Facilities

Its one runway, 16/34, is  asphalt and has two parallel taxiways.

Bend Municipal Airport is identified as a Category 2, High Activity Business and General Aviation airport by the Oregon Department of Aviation. In the year ending June 24, 2008, the airport had 50,100 aircraft operations, average 137 per day: 98% general aviation, 2% air taxi, and <1% military. 199 aircraft were then based at this airport: 80% single-engine, 8% multi-engine, 2% jet, 4% helicopter, 4% glider and 2% ultralight.

References

External links
 
 Aerial image as of 8 May 1994 from USGS The National Map
 

1942 establishments in Oregon
Airports in Deschutes County, Oregon
Bend, Oregon
Airports established in 1942